Allied Corp. was a major American company with operations in the chemical, aerospace, automotive, oil and gas industries. It was initially formed in 1920 as the Allied Chemical and Dye Corporation as an amalgamation of five chemical companies. In 1958, it was renamed Allied Chemical Corporation when it diversified into oil and gas exploration. Allied Chemical then became Allied Corporation in 1981. In 1985, Allied merged with the Signal Companies to become AlliedSignal. AlliedSignal would eventually acquire Honeywell in 1999 and then adopt its name.

History
During World War I, Imperial Germany controlled much of the world's chemical production. This resulted in critical shortages of certain dyes, drugs and especially ammonia, a vital compound used to make fertilizers and explosives.

Allied Chemical and Dye Corporation
 In 1920, publisher Eugene Meyer and noted chemist William Ripley Nichols founded Allied Chemical and Dye Corporation in order to address this shortcoming in American industrial production. Allied was an amalgamation of five existing companies with a total capitalization of $175,000,000, including Barrett Chemical Company (est. 1858), General Chemical Company (est. 1899), National Aniline & Chemical Company (est. 1917), Semet-Solvay Company (est. 1895), and the Solvay Process Company (est. 1881).  All manufacturing was consolidated in Buffalo, and much attention was given to improving the processes hastily introduced during World War I. Allied's first venture into new markets was the construction of a synthetic ammonia plant near Hopewell, Virginia in 1928. This would soon become the world's largest producer of ammonia.

National Aniline and Chemical Works had been formed in 1917 by the merger of Schoellkopf Aniline and Chemical, Beckers Aniline and Chemical of Brooklyn, and the Benzol Products Company. Included also were certain facilities of Semet-Solvay, the Barrett Company, and the General Chemical company that made coal tar intermediates. The executives were Jacob F. Schoellkopf Jr., C. P. Hugo Schoellkopf, I. F. Stone, and Dr. William G. Beckers.

Henry Francis Atherton joined as Secretary of the National Aniline and Chemical Company in the 1920s and 
served as president of Allied Chemical and Dye Corporation from 1934 to 1946. He was also chairman of the board from 1935, until his death in 1949.

Allied Chemical Corporation
After World War II, Allied began manufacturing other products, including Nylon 6, refrigerants and plastic dinnerware. The company name was simplified to reflect this diversification, becoming Allied Chemical Corporation in 1958. It also moved its headquarters to Morristown, New Jersey.

In 1962, Allied bought Union Texas Natural Gas. Allied initially regarded Union as a vertical integration supplier of raw materials for its chemical products. However, CEO John T. Connor, secretary of commerce under president Lyndon Johnson, sold many of Allied's unprofitable businesses in the 1970s and invested more heavily in oil and gas exploration. By 1979, Union Texas was generating 80% of Allied's revenue.

Between 1978 and 1979, Allied funded The MacNeil/Lehrer Report on public television.

Allied Corp.
As the company sought to further diversify its operations, it was renamed Allied Corporation in 1981.

Its next acquisition, in 1983, was Bendix Corporation, an aerospace and automotive firm. By 1984, Bendix was generating 50% of Allied's income, while oil and gas generated 38%.

Between 1964 and 1984, the reporting marks used to identify Allied Chemical's rolling stock on the North American railroad network was NLX.

At one point in 1985, Allied funded Nova on PBS.

AlliedSignal
In 1985, Allied merged with the Signal Companies to become AlliedSignal. The company would eventually acquire Honeywell in 1999, and adopt its name.

See also
British Dyestuffs Corporation
IG Farben
United Alkali Company

References

External links
 
 

.
Aerospace companies of the United States
Companies based in Morris County, New Jersey
American companies established in 1920
Chemical companies established in 1920
Non-renewable resource companies established in 1920
Technology companies established in 1920
Manufacturing companies disestablished in 1985
Non-renewable resource companies disestablished in 1985
Technology companies disestablished in 1985
1920 establishments in New Jersey
1985 disestablishments in New Jersey
Former components of the Dow Jones Industrial Average
Superfund sites in Michigan
Defunct manufacturing companies based in New Jersey
Defunct technology companies based in New Jersey